

Major National Parties
 Bharatiya Janata Party (BJP)
 Indian National Congress (INC)

Major Regional Parties
 Nationalist Democratic Progressive Party (NDPP) of  Neiphiu Rio and Chingwang Konyak
 Naga People's Front (NPF)

Minor National-Level Parties
 National People's Party (NPP) found by late P. A. Sangma
 Nationalist Congress Party (NCP)
 Janata Dal (United) (JDU)  led by Nitish Kumar
 Rashtriya Janata Dal (RJD)
 Republican Party of India (RPI)  led by Ramdas Athawale
 Lok Janshakti Party (LJP)  led by Ram Vilas Paswan
 Aam Aadmi Party (AAP)  led by Arvind Kejriwal
 Communist Party of India (CPI)

Minor Regional Parties
 Naga National Democratic Party (NNDP)
 United Naga Democratic Party (UNDP)

Defunct Political Parties
 National Convention of Nagaland {merged with Naga Peoples Convention}
 Naga Peoples Convention {merged with Naga Nationalist Organisation}
 Naga Nationalist Organisation (NNO) {merged with Congress}
 Naga People's Party {merged with Nagaland People's Council}
 Democratic Labour Party
 United Democratic Front (UDF) {merged into Naga National Democratic Party
 United Democratic Front - Progressive (UDF-P) {merged with Congress}
 Nagaland People's Council (NPC) {renamed as Naga Peoples Front}
 Nagaland Peoples Party (NPP) {merged with Naga Peoples Front}
 Nagaland Democratic Party (NDP) {merged with Naga Peoples Front}
 Naga National Party (NNP) {merged into Naga National Democratic Party}
 Nationalist Democratic Movement (NDM) {merged with BJP}
 Democratic Progressive Party (DPP) {renamed as Nationalist Democratic Progressive Party}
 Nagaland Congress (NC) {merged with NPP}

 
Politics of Nagaland